The name Ivette or Yvette has been used for five tropical cyclones worldwide.

In the Eastern Pacific Ocean:
 Tropical Storm Ivette (2016) – formed in the open ocean.
 Tropical Storm Ivette (2022) – did not affect land.

In the Western Pacific Ocean:
 Typhoon Yvette (1992) (T9223, 22W, Ningning) – category 5 super typhoon that stayed at sea.
 Typhoon Yvette (1995) (T9527, 27W, Oniang) – category 1 typhoon that struck Vietnam as a severe tropical storm.

In the Australian region: 
 Cyclone Yvette (2016) – did not affect land.

Pacific typhoon set index articles
Pacific hurricane set index articles
Australian region cyclone set index articles